Tactile may refer to:

 Tactile, related to the sense of touch
 Haptics (disambiguation)
 Tactile (device), a text-to-braille translation device

See also
 Tangibility, in law
 Somatosensory system, where sensations are processed
 CD96, for the T-cell receptor